Darin is the second studio album by Swedish singer Darin. It was released by Columbia Records on September 28, 2005 in Sweden and features the singles "Step Up", "Want Ya!" and "Who's That Girl?". The album became Darin's second number-one album in Sweden, with the first being The Anthem (2005).

Promotion 
"Step Up" was released as the album's first single on September 7, 2005, the song peaked at number one on the Swedish singles charts In 2012, the single was number 97 on the list of 100 best selling singles in Sweden. The song also charted in Finland.
"Who's That Girl" was released as the second single on 23 November 2005. The song entered the charts at number 17 before peaking at number 6 the week after.
"Want Ya!" was released as the third single on 25 January 2006. The single peaked at number 4 after debuting at number 19 and spent a total of 16 weeks on the charts, the single also peaked at number 8 on the Finnish single charts.

Chart performance 
Darin was released on 28 September 2005 and debuted at number one on the Swedish Albums Chart. It has since been certified platinum by the Swedish Recording Industry Association (GLF). The album was also released in Finland where it peaked at number 13 on the Finnish Albums Chart.

Cover versions 
The song "Sail the Ocean" has been covered in Italian by band Studio 3 for their 3rd album Lentamente and is called "Quando Sarai Sola." Despite the song being a cover version released in 2007, the original songwriters are not credited on the band's official website.

Track listing 
Credits adapted from Spotify.

Charts

Weekly charts

Year-end charts

Certifications

Release history
As of 2020, Darin is available for streaming on Spotify, Tidal, and for download on Google Play Music.

References

2005 albums
Sony BMG albums
Columbia Records albums
Albums produced by RedOne
Albums produced by Ghost (production team)
Darin (singer) albums